Irene Harand (6 September 1900 – 3 February 1975) was an Austrian human rights activist and campaigner against antisemitism.

Harand was born a Roman Catholic in Vienna and was an early organiser of protests against Nazi Germany's persecutions of Jews. She started the Harand Movement, an organisation Weltbewegung gegen Rassenhass und Menschennot (World Movement Against Racial Hatred and Human Suffering) in 1933 and actively campaigned throughout Europe before World War II.

Though not opposed to the Austrofascist rule of Engelbert Dollfuß and his Fatherland's Front, Harand fought against antisemitic sentiments and Nazism. To counter Adolf Hitler's book Mein Kampf, she wrote a book named Sein Kampf - Antwort an Hitler von Irene Harand (His Struggle - the Answer to Hitler from Irene Harand).

In 1937, Irene Harand published a series of anti-Nazi poster stamps (oversized, unofficial stamps often used at the time in promotions) portraying the contributions made by Jews to civilisation over the centuries. 

When Nazi Germany invaded Austria in 1938, Harand was in London lecturing; it saved her life as the Nazis had set a price for her capture of 100,000 Reichsmark. She then emigrated to the United States, where she established the Austrian forum, which after the war was the basis for the Austrian Cultural Forum, of which she became the leader.

In 1969 she received the honorary title of a Righteous among the Nations from the state of Israel for her resistance against the Nazi anti-semitism. Harand died in New York in 1975 and her ashes are buried at Feuerhalle Simmering in Vienna. In 2008 a square in the Vienna district of Wieden was named in her honour.

See also 
 Antisemitism
 Austrian Cultural Forum New York

References

External links
 Austrian Cultural Forum - New York
 Article of Irene Harand (German)
 Article about Irene Harand from the Swedish newspaper Dagens Nyheter (Swedish)
 Biography of Irene Harand on German Amazon (German)
 Irene Harand – her activity to save Jews' lives during the Holocaust, at Yad Vashem website

1900 births
1975 deaths
20th-century Austrian people
Activists against antisemitism
Catholic Righteous Among the Nations
Austrian Roman Catholics
Austrian Righteous Among the Nations
People from Vienna
Recipients of the Decoration of Honour for Services to the Republic of Austria
Burials at Feuerhalle Simmering
20th-century Austrian women writers